Cléopâtre-Diane de Mérode (27 September 1875 – 17 October 1966) was a French dancer of the Belle Époque. She has been referred to as the "first real celebrity icon" and the "first modern celebrity". She was also the first woman whose photographic image, due in particular to photographers Nadar and Léopold-Émile Reutlinger, was distributed worldwide.

Biography

Cléo de Mérode was born in Paris, France, on 27 September 1875. She was the illegitimate daughter of Viennese Baroness Vincentia Maria Cäcilia Catharina de Mérode (1850–1899). Vincentia was estranged from Cléo's father, who was the Austrian judge, lawyer, and pioneer of tourism Theodor Christomannos; Cléo did not meet him until she was a young adult. She was raised Catholic, and affectionately called "Lulu" by her family. At the age of eight, she was sent to study dance with the Sisters of Saint-Vincent-de-Paul, and she made her professional debut at the Paris Opéra at age eleven.

de Mérode became renowned for her glamour even more than for her dancing skills, and her image began appearing on such things as postcards and playing cards. At 16, she debuted her signature hairstyle, a chignon, which became the talk of Parisian women and was quickly adopted as a popular style for all. At the same time, the hairstyle, which covered her ears, caused rumors to circulate that de Mérode was missing one of or both of her ears. In 1895, Henri de Toulouse-Lautrec did her portrait, as would Charles Puyo, Alfredo Müller, Edgar Degas, Manuel Benedito, Georges Clairin, Friedrich August von Kaulbach (who painted her twice), József Rippl-Rónai, François Flameng, Carlos Vázquez Úbeda, Einar Nerman, Henri Gervex, and Giovanni Boldini. She was sculpted by the likes of Alexandre Falguière (who sculpted her twice), Mariano Benlliure, Alphonse Mucha, Ernst Seger, and Eugène-Denis Arrondelle. A sculpture of her done by an anonymous artist can be found at the Galerie Tourbillon, and a wax mask of her by Georges Despret is preserved at the Musée Fin-de-Siècle Museum in Brussels. Georges Goursat also drew several caricatures of de Mérode during the 1900s. Her picture was taken by some of the most illustrious photographers of the day, including Nadar and his son and successor Paul Nadar, Léopold-Émile Reutlinger and his son Jean Reutlinger, Charles Ogerau, Henri Manuel, and Otto Sarony.

In the fall of 1895, a rumor began that de Mérode was King Leopold II's latest mistress, and the two were dubbed "Cléopold" by the media. Because the King had had two children with a woman reputed to be a prostitute, de Mérode's reputation suffered, and she was labeled a "courtesan" or "demimondaine", both of which she is still referred to as today. In an attempt to settle the rumors, de Mérode's mother wrote a letter to the editor of Le Figaro, which was published and then subsequently mocked due to poor spelling. The French agent, Xavier Paoli, recorded in his 1911 book Their Majesties as I Knew Them that the King had never met nor seen de Mérode perform and was unsure of how the rumors began. When he finally met de Mérode after the rumors were already rife, he apologized to her: "Allow me to express my regrets," he told her, "if the good fortune people attribute to me has offended you at all. Alas, we no longer live in an age when a king's favor was not looked upon as compromising! Besides, I am only a little king." de Mérode wrote in her autobiography of the rumor, "I was completely bewildered by the dimensions that this story took on. The tale of my liaison with Léopold sped along, across France, throughout Europe, and around the world. Caricatures, gossip columns, songs, skits, showed the king and me, snuggling, sharing a restaurant table, cracking open champagne at Maxim's, on a cruise, in a Pullman, and so on....I did not know what to make of such inordinate publicity; it stunned me." Michael Garval, de Mérode's biographer, claims that the rumors began after the King accosted de Mérode in the Foyer de la Danse at the Paris Opéra, and that the King may have staged the affair to conceal his actual relations with Émilienne d'Alençon. Garval has also said that although de Mérode posed as a courtesan to increase her fame, she never worked as one.

In the spring of 1896, a second scandal erupted due to the exhibition of the sculpture La Danseuse by Alexandre Falguière at the Salon des Artistes Française. The sculpture was a life-size nude in white marble that was carved from a plaster cast of de Mérode's body. Despite the grain of skin visible on the plaster, proving a live cast, de Mérode accused Falguière of having fabricated a scandalous work by molding the body of the statue on another female model, whereas she posed only for the head. The scandal followed her throughout her career; almost a decade later, in 1904, The Sketch wrote, "Cléo de Mérode is, of course, well known because of her beauty and the Falguière statue, and not on account of her quality as dancer, which is not remarkable." Although de Mérode vehemently denied posing for the sculpture, she later incorporated the work into a stage production in which she starred. The sculpture can now be seen at the Musée d'Orsay.

In the summer of 1896, de Mérode  appeared in a simulated nude scene in the title role of Phryné, a three act ballet-pantomime staged at the Casino Municipal in the seaside resort of Royan. She later recalled, "I appeared before the jury enveloped in a dark grey-blue drapery. I danced in this costume and my gestures made the long folds of fabric undulate in a pretty manner. Underneath I wore a pale rose maillot, covered with a light rose gauze tunic, which hugged my form. When the moment came to seduce the judges, a follower, with one gesture, raised the immense cape and spread it behind me to its full extent. Against this rather dark ground, I was a pink silhouette, and from a distance, with a certain suspension of disbelief on the part of the audience, the flesh-colored feminine form gave the illusion of a nude body." That year she was also elected “Beauty Queen” by 3,000 out of 7,000 votes by readers of L'Illustration. She garnered almost 1,000 votes more than other celebrated names, including Sarah Bernhardt and Gabrielle Réjane.

Despite the two scandals, de Mérode became an international star, performing across Europe and in the United States. In 1897, she arrived in New York City, where she appeared for a month at Koster and Bial's. During her stay in New York, she was besieged by reporters and followed down the street by girls begging for her autograph. de Mérode's performance was heavily anticipated, but was disappointing, the press praising her beauty but saying that she could not dance; Munsey's Magazine said of her, "Cléo de Mérode can go back to her inconspicuous position among the ballet dancers at the Paris Opéra, crowned with the distinction of having made the most successful failure of the season. Critics and public joined in a chorus of disappointment after her first appearance at Koster & Bial's, and yet she has set a new fashion in personal adornment, crowds mark her progress on the street, and large audiences assemble to see her." de Mérode responded to the criticism by saying, "The papers stated that I was a failure, but they lied. I pleased the Americans vastly. The papers pretended that I danced badly, as if Americans could tell. They know nothing about dancing and don't like ballets." Despite the letdown, de Mérode made over forty times her regular monthly Parisian salary, which drew criticism, resulting in de Mérode being dismissed as an "article de Paris" – alluring, but worthless.

In 1898, de Mérode was awarded first prize at a exhibit of the New York Camera Club as being the most beautiful woman in Paris. In 1900, she caused a sensation at the Exposition Universelle with her fake Cambodian dance. She also appeared in two films, one of which was hand-tinted in color; both showed her dancing. At the height of her popularity, she chose to dance at the Folies Bergère in a three-act pantomime titled Lorenza, taking the risk to do something other elites of the ballet had never done before. Her performance gained her a new following, and her popularity further increased. In 1902, de Mérode performed at the Alhambra in London, where her performance was not well received. In contrast, she was popular in Sweden, visiting there in 1903 and 1904. In 1904, she reprised her role as Phryne at the Olympia. In 1906, it was reported that 50,000,000 photographs of de Mérode had been sold and that a single Berlin firm produced 4,000,000 a year. The following year, Everybody's Magazine compared her to the Virgin Mary. Jean Cocteau wrote of her, "She is the beauty of beauty, the virgin who is not, the Pre-Raphaelite lady who walks with downcast eyes through groups [...] The profile of Cléo is so graceful, so divine that the cartoonists break it."

In 1912, de Mérode appeared in the opera La Danseuse de Pompeii as part of the corps de ballet at the Opéra-Comique. The following year in late June, she appeared in the revue Come Over Here at the London Opera House. During World War I, she entertained wounded soldiers. She continued to dance until her late forties; Rupert Doone's partnering of de Mérode in a 1924 social dance recital reportedly inspired Frederick Ashton to pursue a career in dance. Despite a successful comeback, de Mérode retired in 1924 to the seaside resort of Biarritz in the Pyrénées-Atlantiques département of France. She also spent time at the Château de Rastignac with the Lauwick family. At the request of theater director Henri Varna, she reappeared on stage at the Alcazar in June 1934 in La revue 1900 alongside the dancer George Skibine. de Mérode later reflected, “I was wearing a pink satin dress, boned at the waist, very long, with a ruching at the bottom. We danced five waltzes in a row; we ended with a big whirlwind, and Skibine carried me in his arms to the back of the stage.” She then taught ballet before retiring in 1965 at 90 years old. As a hobby, she crafted figurines of dancers, shepherds, and shepherdesses in the classical style which she then sold. 

In 1923, de Mérode unsuccessfully sued the owners of the film Peacock Alley (1922) for 100,000 francs in damages, alleging that the film injured her reputation by burlesquing incidents in her career.

In 1950, de Mérode sued Simone de Beauvoir for libel, claiming five million francs in damages. de Beauvoir had 'wrongly described her as a prostitute who came from peasant stock and had taken an aristocratic sounding stage name as self promotion' in her book The Second Sex. de Mérode won the lawsuit, and the passage was taken out of the book. However, de Mérode only received one franc in damages because "the judge found that Cléo had permitted the rumors during the course of her career for their publicity value". 

In 1955, she published her autobiography, Le Ballet de ma vie (The Dance of My Life).

In 1964, de Mérode was photographed by Cecil Beaton and featured in the 15 February 1964 issue of Vogue.

De Mérode never married or had children, which has led some biographers to categorize her as a lesbian. Paul Klee, who personally knew de Mérode, called her "probably the most beautiful woman alive" and said she "seemed asexual" in a 1902 diary entry. The French novelist Félicien Champsaur reportedly became obsessed with de Mérode and proposed marriage to her multiple times. In her autobiography La ballet de ma vie, de Mérode claimed that she had only been involved with two men in her life. She was engaged to a French aristocrat for nearly ten years before he died of Typhoid fever in 1904, and she was the companion of the Spanish sculptor and diplomat Luis de Périnat, Marquis de Périnat from 1906 to 1919. He left her for Spanish Baroness Ana Maria Elío y Gaztelu, with whom he had a son. de Mérode was close friends with the musician Reynaldo Hahn, who she met when she was seventeen. She lived with her mother until her mother's death in 1899.

She was a vegetarian.

Suffering from dementia, de Mérode died on 17 October 1966 in her Paris apartment at 15 Rue de Téhéran, and was interred at Père Lachaise Cemetery in Division 90. A statue of her by Luis de Périnat, mourning her mother, who is interred in the same plot, decorates the gravestone.

In popular culture

In 1896, de Mérode was featured in The American Tobacco Company's Sweet Caporal brand pinback series of celebrated actresses. More de Mérode-themed items followed, including a nightgown, artificial flowers, cigars, and underwear; the latter two sold for decades.

The 1897 French operetta Les Fêtards parodied de Mérode and King Leopold II's rumored affair, with their names being changed to Théa and Ernest III. The musical comedy The Rounders, on Broadway and on tour nationwide from 1899 to 1900, was based on Les Fêtards, and the character of Théa was portrayed by Phyllis Rankin.

In December 1897, Koster and Bial's traveling company presented "The Big Burlesque Extravaganza 'Gayest Manhattan'" at the Taylor Opera House in Trenton, New Jersey, which featured Gertie Reynolds as "The American Cléo de Mérode".

In May 1900, the John P. Dousman Milling Co. of De Pere released a blotter calendar with de Mérode's photograph on it. The following year, Gimbels and Palais Royal released a line of Cléo de Mérode dolls, complete with clothing and accessories.

Liane de Pougy's 1904 novel Les Sensations de Mlle de la Bringue places de Mérode and King Leopold II at a sabbath; she refers to de Mérode as "Méo de la Clef", who "personified love without making it" and calls King Leopold II "a grand old man with a white beard, her devoted eunuch".

In 1918, she was played by Dorothy Newall in the musical revue Hitchy-Koo. The following year, a comic character named after de Mérode appeared in the operetta Sì. She is mentioned in Henry William Fischer's 1922 book Abroad with Mark Twain and Eugene Field.

The character "Cleo of Paris", played by Mae Murray in the 1922 American silent film Peacock Alley, was a parody of de Mérode. She was portrayed by Fern Andra in the German silent film Women of Passion (1926), and the character Lea de Castro (played by Saffron Burrows) in the Austrian art-house film Klimt (2006) is based on de Mérode. The film focuses on an imaginary romance between the artist Gustav Klimt and Lea de Castro, a Parisian dancer. The character was supposed to be named after de Mérode, but was changed to Lea de Castro – a riff on Laetitia Casta, who was originally supposed to portray her, and Cléo de Mérode. In reality, de Mérode and Klimt never met or had an affair, and de Mérode was not one of his art subjects or muses.

In 1940, artist and filmmaker Joseph Cornell constructed a glass-fronted shadow box dedicated to de Mérode called, "L’Egypte de Mlle. Cléo de Mérode". In 2011, Charles Simic published a poem about the box and de Mérode, which read, "Doll's forearm, loose red sand, wood ball, German coin, several glass and mirror fragments, 12 corkstopped bottles, cutout sphinx [sic] head, yellow filaments, 2 intertwined paper spirals, cut out of Cléo de Mérode's head, cutout of camels and men, loose yellow sand, 6 pearl beads, glass tube with residue of dried green liquid, crumpled tulle, rhinestones, pearl beads, sequins, metal chain, metal and glass fragments, threaded needle, red wood disc, bone and frosted glass fragments, blue celluloid, clear glass crystals, rock specimen, 7 balls, plastic rose petals, three miniature tin spoons for a dollhouse."

In the last decade, there has been a resurgence of interest in de Mérode. In 2012, Michael D. Garval published the book Cléo de Mérode and the Rise of Modern Celebrity Culture, which explores the legacy of de Mérode and studies the neglected prehistory of a visual culture populated by, and obsessed with, celebrities. In 2016, Aaron Jaffe and Jonathan Goldman reaffirmed this in their book Modernist Star Maps: Celebrity, Modernity, Culture. The following year, de Mérode was briefly mentioned in Edward Ross Dickinson's book Dancing in the Blood: Modern Dance and European Culture on the Eve of the First World War, which is about the impact of modern dance on European cultural life in the early twentieth century. In November 2019, Vogue Spain published an article about de Mérode's contribution to the celebrity phenomenon. In 2020, Greg Jenner published the book Dead Famous: An Unexpected History of Celebrity from Bronze Age to Silver Screen, which is about how instrumental modernity’s earlier technologies were in propelling celebrity culture, such as daily newspapers, and how the celebrity phenomenon has changed and stayed the same. The book briefly talks about de Mérode and her rise to fame. In April 2021, Vanity Fair France wrote an article about de Mérode and King Leopold II's rumored affair.

See also
Women in dance

 References 

 Bibliography 
 Cléo de Mérode, Le Ballet de ma vie, Paris, Pierre Horay, 1955, 277 p., ill.
 Christian Corvisier, Cléo de Mérode et la photographie, la première icône moderne, Paris, éditions du Patrimoine, 2007, 127 p., 150 ill.
 Cleo de Merode and the rise of modern celebrity culture, Choice Reviews Online Año:2013 vol.:50 iss:10 pág.:50 -50-5484
 The Last Symbolist Poet.(Art), Time, Hughes, Robert Año:1976 vol.:107 iss:10 pág.:74
 Acts of Containment: Marianne Moore, Joseph Cornell, and the Poetics of Enclosure'', Journal of Modern Literature; Philadelphia, Falcetta, Jennie-Rebecca Año:2006 vol.:29 iss:4 pág.:124 -144

External links 

 Photo Gallery 

1875 births
1966 deaths
French female dancers
Burials at Père Lachaise Cemetery
Cle
19th-century French dancers
French vedettes
French people of Austrian descent
French Roman Catholics
French people of Greek descent
French people of German descent
 French people of Italian descent
 French people of Czech descent
Belle Époque
French ballerinas
French autobiographers
Women autobiographers